The third Iranian Assembly of Experts election was held on October 23, 1998 to elect all 86 members in 28 constituencies. 17,857,869 citizens voted in the elections, marking a 46.3% turnout.

Coming a year after reformist Mohammad Khatami's 1997 presidential victory, there had been speculation that reform-minded individuals would do well in the 1998 race. However, the Guardian Council changed the rules. Previously, candidates had to demonstrate ijtihad, but in 1998 all potential candidates were also required to demonstrate a "proper political inclination".

Out of 396 individuals registered to run, 167 (36.86%) were qualified by the council. 214 were disqualified, 13 withdrew and 60 of 187 invitees did not participate in ijtihad test.

The two leading clerical bodies of reformists, Association of Combatant Clerics and Assembly of Qom Seminary Scholars and Researchers did not issue any electoral list, protesting disqualification of their candidates by the Guardian Council. Other reformist groups did the same, including Mojahedin of the Islamic Revolution of Iran Organization. The only 2nd of Khordad-affiliated group that endorsed candidates was Executives of Construction Party.

Results 

According to Fars News Agency, the results were as follows:

According to Ali Afshari, the composition of assembly was:

See also 

 List of members in the Third Term of the Council of Experts
 Assembly of Experts

References

1998 elections in Iran
October 1998 events in Asia
Assembly of Experts elections
Iran